Suriname competed at the 2011 Pan American Games in Guadalajara, Mexico from October 14 to 30, 2011. Oscar Brandon was the Chef de mission. Suriname competed with eleven athletes in four sports.

Athletics

Suriname sent two athletes.

Men
Track and road events

Women
Track and road events

Badminton

Suriname qualified three male and three female athletes in the badminton competition; this represented more than half the entire team.

Men

Women

Mixed

Swimming

Suriname sent two swimmers.

Men

Women

Taekwondo

Suriname received a wildcard to send one male taekwondo athlete.

Men

References

Nations at the 2011 Pan American Games
P
2011